Ayub bin Jamil is a Malaysian politician who served as Member of the Johor State Executive Council (EXCO) in the Barisan Nasional (BN) state administration under Menteri Besar Hasni Mohammad from March 2020 to March 2022 and Member of the Johor State Legislative Assembly (MLA) for Rengit from March 2004 to March 2022. He is a member of the United Malays National Organisation (UMNO), a component party of the ruling BN coalition.

Election Results

References 

Living people
People from Johor
Malaysian people of Malay descent
Malaysian Muslims
 United Malays National Organisation politicians
21st-century Malaysian politicians
Year of birth missing (living people)
Members of the Johor State Legislative Assembly
Johor state executive councillors